Alisa Kleybanova and Francesca Schiavone were the defending champions. Both were present, but competed with different partners.Kleybanova competed with Hsieh Su-wei, but lost in the first round to Benešová and Záhlavová-Strýcová, while Schiavone competed with Tathiana Garbin, however withdrew before their quarterfinal match against Lisa Raymond and Rennae Stubbs.
Iveta Benešová and Barbora Záhlavová-Strýcová defeated Shahar Pe'er and Peng Shuai 6–4, 4–6, [10–8] in the final.

Seeds

Draw

Draw

External links
 Main Draw

Pan Pacific Open
Toray Pan Pacific Open - Doubles
2010 Toray Pan Pacific Open